Simone Kliass is a Brazilian voiceover actor and a member of Clube da Voz. Kliass is the official voice of the São Paulo International Airport and also the voice of the Avast! antivirus program suite, which is based in São Paulo, Brazil.

References

Brazilian voice actresses
Living people
Year of birth missing (living people)